The 2000 NAPA Autocare 500 was the 28th stock car race of the 2000 NASCAR Winston Cup Series and the 52nd iteration of the event. The race was held on Sunday, October 1, 2000, in Ridgeway, Virginia, at Martinsville Speedway, a  permanent oval-shaped short track. The race took the scheduled 500 laps to complete. At race's end, Tony Stewart, driving for Joe Gibbs Racing, would control the final restart with 11 laps to go to win his eighth career NASCAR Winston Cup Series win and his fifth of the season. To fill out the podium, Dale Earnhardt of Richard Childress Racing and Jeff Burton of Roush Racing would finish second and third, respectively.

Background 

Martinsville Speedway is an NASCAR-owned stock car racing track located in Henry County, in Ridgeway, Virginia, just to the south of Martinsville. At 0.526 miles (0.847 km) in length, it is the shortest track in the NASCAR Cup Series. The track was also one of the first paved oval tracks in NASCAR, being built in 1947 by H. Clay Earles. It is also the only remaining race track that has been on the NASCAR circuit from its beginning in 1948.

Entry list 

 (R) denotes rookie driver.

Practice

First practice 
The first practice session was held on Friday, September 29, at 11:00 AM EST. The session would last for two hours and 30 minutes.

Second practice 
The second practice session was held on Saturday, September 30, at 9:40 AM EST. The session would last for 50 minutes.

Third and final practice 
The final practice session, sometimes referred to as Happy Hour, was held on Saturday, September 30, at 1:00 PM EST. The session would last for one hour.

Qualifying 
Qualifying was split into two rounds. The first round was held on Friday, September 29, at 3:00 PM EST. Each driver would have two laps to set a fastest time; the fastest of the two would count as their official qualifying lap. During the first round, the top 25 drivers in the round would be guaranteed a starting spot in the race. If a driver was not able to guarantee a spot in the first round, they had the option to scrub their time from the first round and try and run a faster lap time in a second round qualifying run, held on Saturday, September 30, at 11:15 AM EST. As with the first round, each driver would have two laps to set a fastest time; the fastest of the two would count as their official qualifying lap. Positions 26-36 would be decided on time, while positions 37-43 would be based on provisionals. Six spots are awarded by the use of provisionals based on owner's points. The seventh is awarded to a past champion who has not otherwise qualified for the race. If no past champion needs the provisional, the next team in the owner points will be awarded a provisional.

Five drivers would fail to qualify: Scott Pruett, Steve Grissom, Carl Long, Dave Marcis, and Rich Bickle.

Full qualifying results

Race results

References 

2000 NASCAR Winston Cup Series
NASCAR races at Martinsville Speedway
October 2000 sports events in the United States
2000 in sports in Virginia